Thomas Ryan (born April 23, 1987 in Salem, Oregon) is an American soccer player.

Career

Youth and College
Ryan played two years of college soccer at Linfield College in his native Oregon, before transferring to Azusa Pacific University as a junior in 2007, the same year Azusa Pacific University won the NAIA National Championship.

Professional
Undrafted out of college, Ryan entered preseason with the Portland Timbers of the USL First Division and later signed with the Portland Timbers U23s in the USL Premier Development League in 2009, featuring in seven games. He signed his first professional contract in 2010 when he signed to play for the Real Maryland Monarchs in the USL Second Division. He made his professional debut on August 7, 2010 in a 2-2- tie with the Charlotte Eagles.

Thomas is currently retired from soccer and owns Tommy Blades Creative, LLC.; Photography and apparel company based out of the Pacific Northwest.

References

External links
Real Maryland Monarchs bio

1987 births
Living people
Soccer players from Oregon
Azusa Pacific Cougars men's soccer players
Cascade Surge players
Portland Timbers U23s players
Real Maryland F.C. players
Sportspeople from Salem, Oregon
Linfield University alumni
USL League Two players
USL Second Division players
Association football defenders
American soccer players